Norman John Goss (born 3 March 1951) is a former Australian rules footballer who played with South Melbourne and Hawthorn in the Victorian Football League (VFL).

Goss was originally from Port Melbourne, the club that his father had played for. He was their best and fairest in back to back years, 1969 and 1970.

In 1972 Goss joined South Melbourne and in 1974 he won the Bob Skilton Medal for their best and fairest player and also topped their goalkicking for the year with 37 goals.

He moved to Hawthorn in 1978 and was a premiership player in his debut season.

In August 2003 he was selected in Port Melbourne's official 'Team of the Century'.
Norm was chairman of selectors for Allan Jeans at Hawthorn and Stan Alves at StKilda.

External links

1951 births
Living people
Australian rules footballers from Victoria (Australia)
Sydney Swans players
Hawthorn Football Club players
Hawthorn Football Club Premiership players
Port Melbourne Football Club players
Bob Skilton Medal winners
One-time VFL/AFL Premiership players